Mieczysław Aszkiełowicz (born 12 January 1957 in Olsztyn) is a Polish politician. He was elected to the Sejm on 25 September 2005, getting 5892 votes in 35 Olsztyn district as a candidate from Samoobrona Rzeczpospolitej Polskiej list.

He was also a member of Sejm 2001-2005.

See also
Members of Polish Sejm 2005-2007

External links
Mieczysław Aszkiełowicz - parliamentary page - includes declarations of interest, voting record, and transcripts of speeches.

1957 births
Living people
People from Olsztyn
Members of the Polish Sejm 2005–2007
Members of the Polish Sejm 2001–2005
Self-Defence of the Republic of Poland politicians